Beaver Glacier is a glacier about  long and  wide, flowing west into Amundsen Bay between Auster Glacier and Mount Gleadell. The head of Beaver Glacier is located very close to the base of Mount King in Enderby Land. It was visited by an Australian National Antarctic Research Expeditions (ANARE) party on October 28, 1956, and named after the Beaver aircraft used by ANARE in coastal exploration.

See also 
 List of glaciers in the Antarctic
 Glaciology

Further reading 
 Charles Swithinbank, Mowson Coast and Enderby Land, Antarctica, Issue 1386, Part 2, P 77
 Ute Christina Herzfeld, Atlas of Antarctica: Topographic Maps from Geostatistical Analysis of Satellite Radar Altimeter Data, P 83

References
 

Glaciers of Enderby Land